Amblydoras monitor is a species of thorny catfish that occurs in the upper Amazon Basin where it can be found in the countries of Brazil, Colombia and Peru.  This species grows to a length of  SL.

References
 

Doradidae
Freshwater fish of Brazil
Freshwater fish of Colombia
Freshwater fish of Peru
Fish of the Amazon basin
Fish described in 1872
Taxa named by Edward Drinker Cope